Deutscher Fernseh-Rundfunk (German Television Broadcasting) was a German television service that first aired on 22 March 1935. It used an early electro-mechanical system, based around the intermediate film technique and the Nipkow disk, at a resolution of 180 lines.

Transmitting from Berlin, via the Fernsehsender Paul Nipkow, initially three times per week for ninety minutes, it was on air until November 1944. However, as television sets were expensive in the mid-1930s, and few were privately owned, the service was mainly viewed in public television parlors within the service area of Greater Berlin.

References

Links
 Vidhouse: Deutscher Fernseh Rundfunk
 World War II in Photographs: Deutscher Fernseh Rundfunk
 Dilemma X: The History of Nazi Germany Television
 German Federal Archives: Fernsehen

Defunct television channels in Germany
History of telecommunications in Germany
Mass media in Berlin
Television channels and stations established in 1935
Television in Germany